Augusta Stevenson (1869–1976) was a writer of children's literature and a teacher. She was born in Indianapolis, Indiana. She wrote over 400 children's books, her most famous being "Childhood of Famous Americans" and "Children's Classics in Dramatic Form."

Life
As well as writing, she taught in Indianapolis Public Schools.

Childhood of Famous Americans
Childhood of Famous Americans was a series of biographies of famous Americans.  The series began in 1932 with Abraham Lincoln, concentrating on his boyhood with a mix of fact and fictional episodes, aimed at children aged 8–12.  Published by Indianapolis company Bobbs-Merrill, it was reprinted every year for the next four years.  Other authors were brought in, including Helen Monsell; the books continued to sell well, and were translated and widely used in schools. Stevenson wrote titles including Booker T. Washington, Ambitious Boy; Ben Franklin, Printer's Boy; George Carver: Boy Scientist, and Clara Barton: Girl Nurse.

Children's Classics in Dramatic Form
The first volume of Children's Classics in Dramatic Form was published in 1908, intended as a textbook for school children, and later republished as Plays for the Home.  It included stories from Aesop, Hans Christian Andersen, the Brothers Grimm, and the 1001 Arabian Nights. Harrap's Dramatic Readers, Book III, published 1911, mainly drew on folklore such as "The Ugly Duckling", "The Crow and the Fox", and "The Emperor's Test".

References

 Library of Congress Authorities record for Augusta Stevenson 
 Stevenson, Augusta (2004). Jay Parini. ed. The Oxford Encyclopedia of American Literature. New York: Oxford.

External links
 
 
 

1869 births
1976 deaths
American children's writers
20th-century American writers
20th-century American women writers